Hozumi is both a Japanese surname and a masculine Japanese given name. Notable people with the name include:

Surname
, Japanese tennis player
, Japanese speed skater
, Japanese handball player
, Japanese lawyer
, Japanese actor and voice actor
, Japanese handball player
, Japanese political scientist

Given name
, Japanese boxer

See also
Hozumi Station, a railway station in Mizuho, Gifu Prefecture, Japan

Japanese-language surnames
Japanese masculine given names